Ethnic Georgians in Belgium number between 1,000 and 2,000 and live mainly in Brussels and Antwerp.

From 2001, in Antwerp is St. Nino Georgian Orthodox Church.

From 2004, in Brussels is St. Tamar Georgian Orthodox Church.

The Georgians have their national dance schools in Brussels, Antwerp and Ostend.

They also have their own language schools. All Georgians speak Georgian language.

Notable Georgians who lived or were educated in Belgium
Barbare Kipiani
Nino Kipiani

References 

Georgian diaspora
Ethnic groups in Belgium
Middle Eastern diaspora in Belgium